Peter John McConnell (born 11 November 1944) is a retired Australian Test cricket match umpire, from Western Australia.

He umpired 22 Test matches between 1983 and 1992.  His first match was between Australia and Pakistan at Perth on 11 November to 14 November 1983, won by Australia by an innings and 9 runs, with Wayne Phillips scoring a century on debut, Graham Yallop also scoring a century and Carl Rackemann taking 11 wickets. McConnell’s partner was Mel Johnson.

McConnell’s last Test match was between Australia and India at Adelaide on 25 January to 29 January 1992, won by Australia by 38 runs  with second innings centuries to David Boon and Mark Taylor after a first innings of only 145, and two 5-wicket bags by Craig McDermott. McConnell’s colleague was Darrell Hair.

During the 1990-91 England tour England spinner Phil Tufnell writes in his biography that McConnell replied "Count them yerself, yer Pommy bastard" when he asked how many balls were left in his over.

McConnell umpired 68 One Day International (ODI) matches between 1983 and 1992.  He umpired two women’s Test matches, in 1977 and 1984.  Altogether, he umpired 82 first-class matches in his career between 1977 and 1992 the Test match noted above being his last.

See also
 List of Test cricket umpires
 List of One Day International cricket umpires

References

External links
 
 

1944 births
Living people
Australian Test cricket umpires
Australian One Day International cricket umpires